Henry Davis Minot (August 18, 1859 – November 14, 1890) was a Massachusetts ornithologist and railroad executive.

Henry was born at his family's estate, Woodbourne in Jamaica Plain, Massachusetts. He was the fourth of five sons born to William and Katherine Maria (Sedgwick) Minot.

He attended Harvard College in 1876, where he was friends with classmate Theodore Roosevelt, who, like Minot, was interested in ornithology. In 1877, he published The Land Birds and Game Birds of New England at the age of seventeen. He left Harvard during his sophomore year.

After leaving Harvard he became involved in railroad investments. He traveled extensively and reported on various railroad systems, from Mexico to Minnesota. He become associated with James J. Hill, and at one point, he was the director of the Great Northern Railway. In 1887, he became the president of a new railroad line which connected Manitoba to Lake Superior. He was also involved in a variety of other commercial enterprises, including steamships and streetcars in Superior, Wisconsin.

He died in a train crash in Pennsylvania, near New Florence, on November 14, 1890.

The city of Minot, North Dakota was named after him, and a park in Massachusetts was dedicated in his honor.

References

External links
 Henry Davis Minot papers
 Henry Davis Minot bio Minot Daily News

American naturalists
1859 births
1890 deaths
American ornithologists
Harvard College alumni

19th-century American businesspeople
People from Jamaica Plain
American railroad executives